Danbara 1-chome is a Hiroden station (tram stop) on Hiroden Hijiyama Line, located in Danbara 1-chome, Minami-ku, Hiroshima.

Routes
From Danbara 1-chome Station, there are one of Hiroden Streetcar routes.

 Hiroshima Station - (via Hijiyama-shita) - Hiroshima Port Route

Connections
█ Hijiyama Line

Matoba-cho — Danbara 1-chome — Hijiyama-shita

Around station
Danbara Elementary School
Matsukawa Park
Hijiyama Shrine
Hijiyama River
Kyoubashi River
Enko River

History
Opened as "Danbara-oohata-machi" on December 27, 1944.
Renamed to "Danbara-ohata-machi" in 1995.
Renamed to "Danbara 1-chome" on November 1, 2001.

See also

Hiroden Streetcar Lines and Routes

Danbara 1-chome Station
Railway stations in Japan opened in 1944

References